Investigation Led by ZnaToKi, or Investigation Led by Experts (translit. Sledstvie vedut ZnaToKi) was a popular 1971-1989 Soviet detective TV-series with two Russian series (2002 and 2003). Total episodes released - 24.

Main characters - investigator Pavel Znamenski, detective Alexandr Tomin and laboratory analyst Zinaida Kibrit were acting together under a group name ZnaToKi (translated as "Experts").

Song by Mark Minkov based on the lyrics Invisible Battle (Nezrimiy Boi - Our mission is both dangerous and difficult, and most invisible at first glance...) by Anatoly Gorokhov features in almost all series. It became an unofficial hymn of the Soviet Militia.

Original Cast Members
 Georgy Martyniuk as Pavel Znamenski, Senior investigator
 Leonid Kanevsky as Aleksandr Tomin, Senior Inspector-detective
 Elza Lezhdey as Zinaida Kibrit, laboratory analyst
 Lidia Velezheva as Kitaeva, laboratory analyst (since 2002, after Elza Lezhdey's death)
 Vera Vasilyeva as Margarita Nikolayevna Znamenskaya, Znamenski's mother
 Semen Sokolovskiy as Colonel Skopin, Chief of Investigation department, Znamenski's boss
 Lev Durov as Afanasiy Filippov, Senior Inspector of GAI (traffic police)
 Anatoly Grachov as Mikhail Tokarev, Senior Inspector of OBKhSS (financial police)

Non-constant cast
 Boris Ivanov		
 Yuri Katin-Yartsev
 Leonid Bronevoy
 Grigory Lampe as Kovalski
 Georgy Menglet
 Valery Nosik
 Stanislav Chekan
 Nikolai Karachentsov
 Leonid Markov
 Iya Savvina
 Leonid Kuravlyov
 Armen Dzhigarkhanyan
 Alexander Kaidanovsky

TV episodes
 Sledstvie vedut znatoki. Case #1: Black Broker / Chyornyy makler (1971)
 Sledstvie vedut znatoki. Case #2: What Is Your True Name / Vashe podlinnoe imya (1971)
 Sledstvie vedut znatoki. Case #3: Red-handed / S polichnym (1971)
 Sledstvie vedut znatoki. Case #4: A Fault Confessed... / Povinnuyu golovu... (1971)
 Sledstvie vedut znatoki. Case #5: Dinosaur / Dinozavr (1972)
 Sledstvie vedut znatoki. Case #6: Blackmail / Shantazh (1972)
 Sledstvie vedut znatoki. Case #7: Accident / Neschastnyy sluchay (1972)
 Sledstvie vedut znatoki. Case #8: The Escape / Pobeg (1973)
 Sledstvie vedut znatoki. Case #9: Witness / Svidetel (1974)
 Sledstvie vedut znatoki. Case #10: Strike Back / Otvetnyy udar (1975)
 Sledstvie vedut znatoki. Case #11: At Any Price / Lyuboy tsenoy (1977)
 Sledstvie vedut znatoki. Case #12: 'Bouquet' Is Standing By / 'Buket' na priyome (1977)
 Sledstvie vedut znatoki. Case #13: Before The Third Gunshot / Do tretyego vystrela (1978)
 Sledstvie vedut znatoki. Case #14: Herdsboy With A Cucumber / Podpasok s ogurtsom (1979)
 Sledstvie vedut znatoki. Case #15: Went And Never Returned / Ushel i ne vernulsya (1980)
 Sledstvie vedut znatoki. Case #16: From The Life Of A Fruits / Iz zhizni fruktov (1981)
 Sledstvie vedut znatoki. Case #17: He's Somewhere Here / On gde-to zdes' (1982)
 Sledstvie vedut znatoki. Case #18: Midday Thief / Poludennyy vor (1985)
 Sledstvie vedut znatoki. Case #19: The Fire / Pozhar (1985)
 Sledstvie vedut znatoki. Case #20: Boomerang / Bumerang (1987)
 Sledstvie vedut znatoki. Case #21: Without The Knife And A Knuckleduster / Bez nozha i kasteta (1988)
 Sledstvie vedut znatoki. Case #22: Mafia / Mafiya (1989)
 Sledstvie vedut znatoki. Case #23: Arbitrator / Treteyskiy sudiya (2002)
 Sledstvie vedut znatoki. Case #24: Pood Of Gold / Pud zolota (2003)

External links
 Episode 01, Episode 02, Episode 03, Episode 04, Episode 05, Episode 06, Episode 07, Episode 08,
 Episode 09, Episode 10, Episode 11, Episode 12, Episode 13, Episode 14, 
 Episode 15, Episode 16, Episode 17, Episode 18, Episode 19, Episode 20, Episode 21, Episode 22, Episode 23 at IMDb

Channel One Russia original programming
Soviet television miniseries
1970s Soviet television series
1980s Soviet television series
2000s Russian television series